Eupholus geoffroyi is a species of beetle belonging to the  family Curculionidae.

Description
The basic colour is metallic blue-green, with three transversal black bands along the elytra. The blue-green colour derives from very small scales. The tops of the antennae are black.

Distribution
This species can be found in New Guinea

References

 Biolib
 Universal Biological Indexer
 Eupholus geoffroyi

External links
 Eupholus geoffroyi

Entiminae
Insects of Papua New Guinea
Insects of Western New Guinea
Taxa named by Félix Édouard Guérin-Méneville
Beetles described in 1830